Oliver Cromwell Hackett was born March 29, 1822 in Scott County, Kentucky. His father was John Hackett, and his grandfather was noted Kentucky frontiersman and militiaman of the American Revolution, Peter Hackett. John Hackett moved the family, including young O. C., from Kentucky to Coles County, Illinois in 1835. O. C. Hackett married Ellen Roxanne (Wyeth) on March 14, 1854. O. C.'s children included Frederick W. Hackett. O. C. died April 8, 1905 in Tuscola, Illinois. Family legend holds that Abraham Lincoln stayed at the Hackett farm near Charleston Illinois before or after the 4th of the Lincoln-Douglas debates of 1858.

Illinois pioneer and participant in the California Gold Rush
In late 1849 or 1850 O. C. joined the California Gold Rush, traveling to California by way of the Isthmus of Panama and setting up a claim in the Auburn area. O.C. soon left the gold fields to return to the farm in Illinois.

In the mid-1850s O. C. bought a farm just outside Tuscola, in Douglas County, Illinois. O. C. Hackett was the founding Supervisor of Tuscola township, and was elected in 1868. Hackett was elected Supervisor with a majority of only one vote over W. B. Ervin. O. C. planted Hackett's Grove, a sassafras grove situated on Section 31, Township 16, Range 9, on the east side of the township. This  grove is traversed by a branch of Scattering Fork of the Embarrass River, long known as Hackett's Run, and according to the History of Douglas County (1884), the grove had been owned by the Hacketts since long before Douglas County had an existence.

References

Sources and external links
http://www.iltrails.org/Coles/early_settlers_1.htm—Early Settlers of Coles County, Illinois

http://genealogytrails.com/ill/coles/history.html—History of Coles County, Illinois

Douglas County, Illinois

Hackett (surname)

California Gold Rush

List of people associated with the California Gold Rush

Hackett, O. C.
People from Scott County, Kentucky
People from Tuscola, Illinois